Babu is a 1971 Indian Tamil language film directed by A. C. Tirulokchandar. The film stars Sivaji Ganesan, Sowcar Janaki and Vennira Aadai Nirmala. It is a remake of the Malayalam film Odayil Ninnu, which itself was based on P. Kesavadev's novel of the same name. Ganesan played a rickshaw puller who adopts landlord's daughter. The film became a blockbuster at the box-office, running for over 100 days in theaters.

Plot 
Babu is an orphan and a rickshaw puller. He loses the only person he has ever loved, the lunch girl Kannamma, and gives up on life. Once, he meets Sankar, who takes him to his house, gives him his new clothes as he is in impoverished state and lets his daughter eat with him on the same plate without any regards to his appearance or class. Babu becomes indebted to the family for life. Sankar dies and Babu takes it upon himself to fulfil the dreams of Sankar, making Ammu a graduate.

With the usual troubles of society miscasting the relationship between Parvathi and Babu, things get worse when Ammu falls in love with Prem affecting her education. She realizes the truth soon and starts focusing on her education. Finally, when time comes for marriage between rich Prem and educated Ammu, Babu wants to stay away for he does not want the stigma of being brought up by a poor uneducated rickshaw associated with her. Ammu, Parvathi, Prem and Vedhachalam, millionaire father of Prem, insist on his persence and with the threat of calling of the marriage, he relents.

Cast 
Sivaji Ganesan as Babu
Sowcar Janaki as Parvathi
Vennira Aadai Nirmala as Ammu
K. Balaji as Sankar
Major Sundarrajan as Vedhachalam
V. K. Ramasamy as Singaram Pillai
Nagesh as Thulukanam
Sivakumar as Prem
M. R. R. Vasu as Vatti Vadivel
Vijayasri as Kannamma
S. V. Ramadas as Mill Owner
A. Karunanidhi as Siluvai
Roja Ramani as Young Ammu
Sridevi as Child Ammu
Shanmugasundari as Bakkiyam
Karuppu Subbiah as Rickshaw puller
 Vijayachandrika as Thulukanam's wife

Soundtrack 
The music was composed by M. S. Viswanathan, while the lyrics were written by Vaali. The song "Idho Endhan Deivam" became popular upon release.

References

External links 
 

1970s Tamil-language films
1971 films
Films directed by A. C. Tirulokchandar
Films scored by M. S. Viswanathan
Tamil remakes of Malayalam films